Mary Elizabeth Patterson (November 22, 1874 – January 31, 1966) was an American theatre, film, and television character actress who gained popular recognition late in her career playing the elderly neighbor Matilda Trumbull on the television comedy series I Love Lucy.

Early years 
Born in Savannah, Tennessee, she was the child of Mildred (née McDougal) and Edmund D. Patterson, a Confederate army veteran.  Federal census records document that her father by 1880 was a lawyer and residing with his wife and children in the home of his father-in-law, Garrick Archibald McDougal, a widower, who was also a lawyer and farmer in Savannah.  That same census lists Elizabeth as the second child of the Pattersons' four offspring.  She had an older sister, Annie Belle, and two younger brothers, Edmund and Archie.

Stage
She was educated at Tennessee colleges in Pulaski and Columbia, where her participation in campus theater groups fostered a growing passion for drama. Her parents soon sent her to Europe in hopes of diminishing her interest in theater; yet, Patterson's determination to become an actress was only reinforced during those travels, especially in Paris, where she attended productions of the Comédie Française.

After returning from Europe, Patterson used money from a small inheritance to move to Chicago. There she joined a theatrical troupe and subsequently toured with repertory companies. In 1913, she made her Broadway debut in the play Everyman. She remained active in New York City theatre through 1954.

Film
In 1926, at the age of 51, Patterson was cast in her first movie, a silent film, The Boy Friend.  Transitioning successfully into the era of "talkies", she remained a very busy actress in Hollywood throughout the 1930s, averaging more than five films a year during that decade, usually in supporting roles. A few of her screen credits at that time include Tarnished Lady; Husband's Holiday; A Bill of Divorcement; So Big!; The Story of Temple Drake; Hold Your Man; Remember the Night; Dinner at Eight; High, Wide, and Handsome; and No Man of Her Own. She also appeared in the role of Susan in two adaptations of John Willard's popular play The Cat and the Canary: The Cat Creeps in 1930 and The Cat and the Canary in 1939.

Patterson continued to perform frequently in the 1940s, when she was cast in more than 30 additional films.  Among her notable roles is her 1949 portrayal of the heroic character Eunice Habersham in the groundbreaking racial crime drama Intruder in the Dust, a film based on the William Faulkner novel of the same name and set in the Deep South.  Although she would appear in a few more feature films in the 1950s, such as Washington Story and Pal Joey, Patterson by then began to focus her work increasingly on roles in the rapidly expanding medium of television.

Television
In 1952, at the age of 77, Patterson made her first appearance on the hit CBS-TV sitcom I Love Lucy in the episode "The Marriage License". In that installment, Patterson's character, Mrs. Willoughby, is the wife of the Greenwich, Connecticut, justice of the peace (played by character actor Irving Bacon) who remarries Lucy and Ricky Ricardo. In that role, she most notably sings an off-key version of "I Love You Truly" during the wedding ceremony. The following year she was cast in a featured guest role as Mrs. Matilda Trumbull in the episode "No Children Allowed". Patterson's character of Mrs. Trumbull was initially an ornery curmudgeon who resided in the same New York apartment building as the Ricardos. In that installment, she threatened to make trouble for the Ricardos since the building did not allow children. At the end of the episode, however, her character softens as she holds for the first time the Ricardos' baby, "Little Ricky"; and, as a result, Mrs. Trumbull becomes friends with both the Ricardos and the building's owners, Fred and Ethel Mertz.

Patterson's character on I Love Lucy proved to be so popular among viewers, as well as useful to the writers of the series, that she continued in the role for three more years, often serving in episode storylines as a convenient babysitter for "Little Ricky". In the fall of 1956, with I Love Lucy in its final season, Patterson made her last appearance as Mrs. Trumbull in "Little Ricky Learns to Play the Drums". Her character was mentioned one last time in the 1957 episode "Lucy Raises Chickens". In that installment, Fred and Ethel decide to follow the Ricardos and move to Connecticut to be near them, and Mrs. Trumbull's sister moves into 623 East 68th Street to manage the apartment building for the Mertzes.

Personal life and death
Patterson, who never married, lived at the Hollywood Roosevelt Hotel during her 35-year film and television career. On January 31, 1966, she died at age 91 in Los Angeles of complications from pneumonia.  Her gravesite is in Savannah Cemetery in her hometown in Tennessee.

See also

Bibliography

References and notes

External links

 
 
 
  Elizabeth Patterson buys grapefruit orchard

1874 births
1966 deaths
Actresses from Tennessee
American film actresses
Patterson,Elizabeth
American stage actresses
American television actresses
People from Savannah, Tennessee
Burials in Tennessee
Deaths from pneumonia in California
20th-century American actresses